Emma Ishta Douglas-Powell (born 16 November 1990) is an Australian model and actress. She is best known for portraying Kirsten Clark on the Freeform drama series Stitchers.

Early life
Ishta was born in Brookfield, Queensland, Australia. She has a younger brother, Thomas Douglas-Powell, who is a professional volleyball player.

Ishta was educated at St Aidan's Anglican Girls' School in Corinda, Brisbane, Queensland. She was later accepted into the music program at Queensland University of Technology but deferred her studies to pursue modeling.

Career
Ishta began modeling around age 13. She began working with IMG Models when she was 15 and relocated to New York in 2009.

In 2014, Ishta began to venture into acting and landed guest roles on Black Box, Power, and Manhattan Love Story. She starred in her first film, I Smile Back, in 2015.

In May 2014, it was announced that Ishta had been cast in the lead role of Kirsten Clark in the American TV series Stitchers. The Freeform series premiered on 2 June 2015. In September 2017, it was announced that the series had been cancelled after three seasons.

Personal life
On September 8, 2012, Ishta married New York native and playwright Daniel James McCabe. They both starred in his play The Flood, which premiered at the 2014 New York International Fringe Festival and won the Award for Excellence in Playwriting. Through this marriage, she has one stepdaughter. On June 16, 2016, the couple welcomed their first child together, a son.

Filmography

Film

Television

Producer

References

External links
 

1990 births
Living people
Australian television actresses
Australian female models
IMG Models models
21st-century Australian actresses
Actresses from Queensland